The Kotli District is one of the 10 districts of Pakistan's dependent territory of Azad Kashmir.  It is bounded on the north by the Sudhanoti District and the Poonch District, on the north-east by the Poonch District of Indian-administered Jammu and Kashmir, on the south by the Mirpur District and the Bhimber District, and on the west by the Rawalpindi District on Pakistan's Punjab Province. It is the biggest district of Azad Kashmir by population and the second biggest by land area, after the Neelum District.  The district headquarters is the city of Kotli. 

The main native languages are Pahari (estimated to be spoken by just under two thirds of the population), and Gujari (spoken by about a third).

Administrative divisions
The Kotli District was previously a subdivision of the Mirpur District until 1975. Before 1947, it was part of the Jammu area of Jammu and Kashmir. The district is divided into five tehsils:

 Kotli Tehsil
 Charhoi Tehsil
 Sehnsa Tehsil
 Fatehpur Nakyal Tehsil
 Khuiratta Tehsil
 Dilyan Jattan Tehsil

Education 
According to the Pakistan District Education Ranking 2017, a report by Alif Ailaan, the Kotli District stands at number 7 nationally relating to education, with a score of 73.68. The learning score stands at 85.67 and gender parity is at 93.45.

According to the same report, the Kotli District is ranked at 119 nationally, with a learning score of 35.47 and a retention score of 35.36. The learning score is low because of a lack of quality teachers and proper teacher training. The retention score is low because of the low number of beyond-primary schools.

With regard to infrastructure, the Kotli District stands at 154, with a score of 14.14, which is the second lowest in Pakistan and its two dependent territories. That score shows that there is a serious problem with the lack of basic facilities such as electricity, functional toilets, furniture, and boundary walls.

See also
 Dahana
 Ethnic Groups of Azad Kashmir

References

Notes

Citations

External links 
Azad Jammu and Kashmir Govt. Kotli page

 
Districts of Azad Kashmir